Mikhail Sergeyevich Kazelin (born 19 September 1996) is a Russian speed skater.

Career
In November 2015 Kazelin won the 1000m event at the Junior World Cup in Groningen. That season he won the overall 500m competition. He took part in the first competition weekend of the 2018–19 ISU Speed Skating World Cup where he finished 10th in the 1500m Division B event.

Personal records

Personal life
He is the twinbrother of speed skater Elizaveta Kazelina.

References

External links
 
 Mikhail Kazelin bio page 	
 Mikhail Kazelin sports bio
 ISU profile

1996 births
Russian male speed skaters
Living people
Twin sportspeople
Russian twins
Speed skaters at the 2012 Winter Youth Olympics
20th-century Russian people
21st-century Russian people